Bruno Martín Correa Araújo (born 27 July 1991) is a Uruguayan footballer who plays as a midfielder or winger for Liverpool (Montevideo).

Career

Correa started his career with Wanderers in Uruguay before joining the youth academy of Peñarol, Uruguay's most successful club.

Before the second half of 2013/14, Correa signed for Villa Teresa in the Uruguayan second division, where he made 8 league appearances and scored 1 goal.

Before the 2018 season, Correa signed for Uruguayan top flight side River Plate (Montevideo), where he made 20 league appearances and scored 4 goals.

References

External links
 
 

Sud América players
Uruguayan footballers
Living people
1991 births
Footballers from Montevideo
C.S.D. Villa Española players
Uruguayan Primera División players
Association football wingers
Uruguayan Segunda División players
Association football midfielders
Montevideo Wanderers F.C. players
C.A. Progreso players
Villa Teresa players
Canadian Soccer Club players
Montevideo City Torque players
Club Atlético River Plate (Montevideo) players
Defensor Sporting players
Liverpool F.C. (Montevideo) players